Brooding Eyes is a 1926 American silent crime film directed by Edward LeSaint and starring Lionel Barrymore, Ruth Clifford and Robert Ellis.

Cast
 Lionel Barrymore as Slim Jim Carey 
 Ruth Clifford as Joan Ayre 
 Robert Ellis as Phillip Mott 
 Montagu Love as Pat Callaghan 
 William V. Mong as Slaney 
 Lucien Littlefield as Bell 
 John Miljan as Drummond 
 Dot Farley as Marie De Costa 
 Alma Bennett as Agnes De Costa

References

Bibliography
 Munden, Kenneth White. The American Film Institute Catalog of Motion Pictures Produced in the United States, Part 1. University of California Press, 1997.

External links

1926 films
1926 crime films
American crime films
Films directed by Edward LeSaint
American silent feature films
American black-and-white films
1920s English-language films
1920s American films